Emilia Bashur (née Valeva), known by her stage name Emilia, is a Bulgarian pop folk singer. She has released eight studio albums to date.

Early life
Emilia was born in Galabovo on 21 March 1982. She has one older sister, Daniela. Emilia became interested in music at an early age and began singing in the local choir. She began learning traditional Bulgarian music with Jivka Dimitrova and Dimitar Kolev. Several years later, she signed a contract with the Bulgarian record label Payner.

In 1999, she recorded her first song- "Its over with you" which became popular in the pop-folk culture. Her debut album Veselo Momiche (Happy Girl) was successful.

She has a son, Ivan and a daughter, Mira.

Discography

Studio albums
2001: Весело Момиче (Veselo Momiche — Happy Girl)
2002: Нежни Устни (Nezhni Ustni — Tender Lips)
2003: Ангел в Нощта (Angel v Noshta — Angel in the Night)
2005: Самотна Cтая (Samotna Staia — Lonely Room)
2006: Мисли за Mен (Misli za Men — Think About Me)
2008: Родена съм да те обичам (Rodena sum da te obicham – I was born to love you)
2010: Така ми харесва (Taka mi haresva — I like that)
2012: Смелите си имат всичко (Smelite si imat vsichko — The Brave Have It All)
2015: Ех, Българийо красива (Eh, Balgariyo krasiva — Ah, beautiful Bulgaria)

Greatest hits
2007: Целувай ме – Best Ballads (Tseluvay me – Kiss me)
2013: Златните хитове на Емилия (Zlatnite hitove na Emilia — Golden hits of Emilia)

Video albums
2006: Emilia Best Video Selection

Planeta Tours
Emilia took part in Planeta Tours in 2004, 2005, 2006, 2007, 2009, 2010 and 2014.

References

External links
 Payner Music website
 Emilia discography at mp3-bg.com
 Planeta TV
 Chalga icons

1982 births
21st-century Bulgarian women singers
Bulgarian folk singers
Bulgarian folk-pop singers
Living people
People from Radnevo
Symphonic rock musicians
Payner artists